Emily Padgett (born September 20, 1984) is an American actress, singer, and dancer.

She is known for her work on Broadway as Daisy Hilton in Side Show and Sherrie Christian in Rock of Ages, as well as for originating the roles of Lucy Grant in Steve Martin and Edie Brickell's Bright Star, and Mrs. Bucket in Charlie and the Chocolate Factory.

Life and career

1984–2008: Early life, Cats, and Broadway Debut
Padgett was born in Danbury, Connecticut, but moved to Lewisville, North Carolina in 1986 when she was two. Her love for musical theatre started at an early age when her parents would go to New York City on vacation, bringing home cast recordings for Padgett as souvineres. She took part in her high school theatre program, being cast as Maria in West Side Story at sixteen, a role she "had no business playing." Eager to work and get out of North Carolina, Padgett enrolled in the two year program at the American Musical and Dramatic Academy in New York City, as opposed to a traditional four year program. Following graduation, Padgett quickly booked the role of Demeter in the non-Equity national tour cast of Andrew Lloyd Webber's Cats in 2005. She departed the tour after a year, and started attending open calls in the city while balancing odd jobs. Padgett danced at bar mitzvahs and entertained at children's birthday parties as Nemo from Disney's Finding Nemo. In 2007, she made her Broadway debut in Grease in the ensemble, and as a swing, understudying Sandy, Patty, and Cha-Cha. In 2008, Padgett departed the production and joined the cast of Legally Blonde, as Cece/District Attorney, and understudying Shandi/Brooke, Margot, and Pilar. After Legally Blonde closed, Padgett was offered the role of Sandy in the first national tour company of Grease. She played the role for a year.

2009–2013: Rock of Ages and Flashdance
In 2009, Padgett was cast as Waitress #1, and understudied Kerry Butler's role in the rock musical Rock of Ages on Broadway. In 2010, Kerry Butler departed the production, and Padgett was cast as her replacement, making Sherrie Christian the first lead role Padgett played on Broadway. Padgett departed in 2011. In 2011, Padgett starred as Eden in the Whoopi Goldberg-produced White Noise: A Cautionary Musical at the Royal George Theatre in Chicago. After the show closed, Padgett shortly returned to Rock of Ages as Sherrie. In 2013, Padgett was cast as Alex Owens in the musical version of the 1983 film Flashdance.

2014–16: Side Show and Bright Star
In 2014, Padgett starred as Daisy Hilton in Side Show at Kennedy Center for the Performing Arts and La Jolla Playhouse. On September 12, 2014, it was announced that Padgett would star in the Broadway revival opposite Erin Davie. The revival closed on January 4, 2015. On April 17, 2015, it was announced that Padgett would star in Waterfall, a new musical, at the Pasadena Playhouse. On October 26, 2015, it was announced that Padgett would star as Lucy Grant in Steve Martin and Edie Brickell's new musical, Bright Star. The show began previews at the Cort Theatre on Broadway on February 25, 2016 before officially opening on March 24. The musical closed on June 26, 2016 after 30 previews and 109 regular performances.

2016–present: Sweet Charity and Charlie and the Chocolate Factory
On August 9, 2016, it was announced that Padgett would join Sutton Foster in a limited run, off-Broadway revival of Sweet Charity. The show closed on January 8, 2017. On December 19, 2016, it was announced that Padgett would star as Mrs. Bucket in Charlie and the Chocolate Factory.

Theatre credits

Sources:

Filmography

Television

Sources:

Discography
 2007: Grease (2007 New Broadway Cast Recording)
 2013: Flashdance (Original Demo Cast Recording)
 2014: Side Show (2014 New Broadway Cast Recording)
 2013: Side Show: Added Attractions (2014 New Broadway Cast Live at 54 Below)
 2013: Bright Star (Original Broadway Cast Recording)
 2013: Charlie and the Chocolate Factory (Original Broadway Cast Recording)

Sources:

Awards and nominations

Personal life
On January 12, 2017, Padgett got engaged to actor Josh Young. They were married on June 3, 2018. The couple welcomed their first child, a daughter named Adele May Young, on February 3, 2019.

References

1984 births
21st-century American actresses
Actresses from Connecticut
American film actresses
American musical theatre actresses
American sopranos
American stage actresses
Living people
Oklahoma State University alumni
People from Danbury, Connecticut
People from Lewisville, North Carolina